The Hits Collection may refer to:

 The Hits Collection (video), a 1993 video album by Prince
 The Hits Collection (Kim Wilde album), a 2006 compilation album by Kim Wilde
 The Hits Collection, a 2000 compilation album by Cameo
 The Hits Collection, Volume One, a 2010 compilation album by Jay-Z

See also
 Hits Collection (disambiguation)